In geometry, a honeycomb is a space filling or close packing of polyhedral or higher-dimensional cells, so that there are no gaps. It is an example of the more general mathematical tiling or tessellation in any number of dimensions. Its dimension can be clarified as n-honeycomb for a honeycomb of n-dimensional space. 

Honeycombs are usually constructed in ordinary Euclidean ("flat") space. They may also be constructed in non-Euclidean spaces, such as hyperbolic honeycombs.  Any finite uniform polytope can be projected to its circumsphere to form a uniform honeycomb in spherical space.

Classification
There are infinitely many honeycombs, which have only been partially classified. The more regular ones have attracted the most interest, while a rich and varied assortment of others continue to be discovered.

The simplest honeycombs to build are formed from stacked layers or slabs of prisms based on some tessellations of the plane. In particular, for every parallelepiped, copies can fill space, with the cubic honeycomb being special because it is the only regular honeycomb in ordinary (Euclidean) space.  Another interesting family is the Hill tetrahedra and their generalizations, which can also tile the space.

Uniform 3-honeycombs
A 3-dimensional uniform honeycomb is a honeycomb in 3-space composed of uniform polyhedral cells, and having all vertices the same (i.e., the group of [isometries of 3-space that preserve the tiling] is transitive on vertices). There are 28 convex examples in Euclidean 3-space, also called the Archimedean honeycombs.

A honeycomb is called regular if the group of isometries preserving the tiling acts transitively on flags, where a flag is a vertex lying on an edge lying on a face lying on a cell.  Every regular honeycomb is automatically uniform.  However, there is just one regular honeycomb in Euclidean 3-space, the cubic honeycomb. Two are quasiregular (made from two types of regular cells):

The tetrahedral-octahedral honeycomb and gyrated tetrahedral-octahedral honeycombs are generated by 3 or 2 positions of slab layer of cells, each alternating tetrahedra and octahedra. An infinite number of unique honeycombs can be created by higher order of patterns of repeating these slab layers.

Space-filling polyhedra

A honeycomb having all cells identical within its symmetries is said to be cell-transitive or isochoric. In the 3-dimensional euclidean space, a cell of such a honeycomb is said to be a space-filling polyhedron. A necessary condition for a polyhedron to be a space-filling polyhedron is that its Dehn invariant must be zero, ruling out any of the Platonic solids other than the cube.

Five space-filling polyhedra can tessellate 3-dimensional euclidean space using translations only. They are called parallelohedra:
 Cubic honeycomb (or variations: cuboid,  rhombic hexahedron or parallelepiped)
 Hexagonal prismatic honeycomb
 Rhombic dodecahedral honeycomb
 Elongated dodecahedral honeycomb
 Bitruncated cubic honeycomb or truncated octahedra

Other known examples of space-filling polyhedra include:
 The triangular prismatic honeycomb
 The gyrated triangular prismatic honeycomb
 The triakis truncated tetrahedral honeycomb. The Voronoi cells of the carbon atoms in diamond are this shape.
 The trapezo-rhombic dodecahedral honeycomb
 Isohedral tilings

Other honeycombs with two or more polyhedra
Sometimes, two  or more different polyhedra may be combined to fill space. Besides many of the uniform honeycombs, another well known example is the Weaire–Phelan structure, adopted from the structure of clathrate hydrate crystals

Non-convex 3-honeycombs
Documented examples are rare. Two classes can be distinguished:
Non-convex cells which pack without overlapping, analogous to tilings of concave polygons. These include a packing of the small stellated rhombic dodecahedron, as in the Yoshimoto Cube.
Overlapping of cells whose positive and negative densities 'cancel out' to form a uniformly dense continuum, analogous to overlapping tilings of the plane.

Hyperbolic honeycombs

In 3-dimensional hyperbolic space, the dihedral angle of a polyhedron depends on its size.  The regular hyperbolic honeycombs thus include two with four or five dodecahedra meeting at each edge; their dihedral angles thus are π/2 and 2π/5, both of which are less than that of a Euclidean dodecahedron.  Apart from this effect, the hyperbolic honeycombs obey the same topological constraints as Euclidean honeycombs and polychora.

The 4 compact and 11 paracompact regular hyperbolic honeycombs and many compact and paracompact uniform hyperbolic honeycombs have been enumerated.

Duality of 3-honeycombs

For every honeycomb there is a dual honeycomb, which may be obtained by exchanging:
 cells for vertices.
 faces for edges.

These are just the rules for dualising four-dimensional 4-polytopes, except that the usual finite method of reciprocation about a concentric hypersphere can run into problems.

The more regular honeycombs dualise neatly:
The cubic honeycomb is self-dual.
That of octahedra and tetrahedra is dual to that of rhombic dodecahedra.
The slab honeycombs derived from uniform plane tilings are dual to each other in the same way that the tilings are.
The duals of the remaining Archimedean honeycombs are all cell-transitive and have been described by Inchbald.

Self-dual honeycombs 
Honeycombs can also be self-dual. All n-dimensional hypercubic honeycombs with Schläfli symbols {4,3n−2,4}, are self-dual.

See also

 List of uniform tilings
 Regular honeycombs
 Infinite skew polyhedron
 Plesiohedron

References

Further reading
 Coxeter, H. S. M.: Regular Polytopes.
  Chapter 5: Polyhedra packing and space filling
 Critchlow, K.: Order in space.
 Pearce, P.: Structure in nature is a strategy for design.
 Goldberg, Michael Three Infinite Families of Tetrahedral Space-Fillers Journal of Combinatorial Theory A, 16, pp. 348–354, 1974.
 
 Goldberg, Michael The Space-filling Pentahedra II, Journal of Combinatorial Theory 17 (1974), 375–378.
 
 
 Goldberg, Michael Convex Polyhedral Space-Fillers of More than Twelve Faces. Geom. Dedicata 8, 491-500, 1979.

External links
 
 Five space-filling polyhedra, Guy Inchbald, The Mathematical Gazette 80, November 1996, p.p. 466-475.
 Raumfueller (Space filling polyhedra) by T.E. Dorozinski
 

 
 
Polytopes